Odonticium romellii is a species of fungus belonging to the family Rickenellaceae.

It is native to Europe and Northern America.

References

Hymenochaetales